Billy Merrell (born January 7, 1982) is an American author and poet. He published his first book Talking in the Dark, a poetry memoir, with Scholastic in 2003. He also co-edited The Full Spectrum: A New Generation of Writing About Gay, Lesbian, Bisexual, Transgender, Questioning, and Other Identities for Knopf Books for Young Readers with David Levithan. It was released in 2006 and won the 2007 Lammy in the Children's/Young Adult category.

Merrell lives in Brooklyn with his husband Nico Medina. He grew up in Jacksonville, FL and then moved to New York, where he lives now.

Works
 Talking in the Dark (2003)
 The Full Spectrum: A New Generation of Writing About Gay, Lesbian, Bisexual, Transgender, Questioning, and Other Identities, ed. with David Levithan (2006)
 Vanilla (2017)

External links
 Author's Site

References 

21st-century American poets
Lambda Literary Award for Children's and Young Adult Literature winners
1982 births
Living people
American gay writers
Place of birth missing (living people)
American LGBT poets
American male poets
21st-century American male writers
21st-century LGBT people
Gay poets